Tongren No.1 Middle School of Guizhou is a secondary school in Chuandong Education Zone (川硐教育园区 Chuāndòng Jiàoyù Yuánqū), Bijiang District, Tongren, Guizhou.

It was established in 1938 as the Guizhou National Secondary School and later renamed to No. 3 National Secondary School. After the Second Sino-Japanese War/World War II ended, it became a provincial school, Guizhou Provincial Tongren Secondary School. After the conclusion of the Chinese Civil War in 1949, it became Guizhou Province Tongren Secondary School. It adopted its current name in 1973.

Circa 2016 the administration converted some former toilet facilities into extra dormitories, resulting in criticism on social media.

References

External links
 No. 1 Middle School of Tongren, Guizhou 

Education in Guizhou
Secondary schools in China
Boarding schools in China